Public opinion on gun control in the United States has been tracked by numerous public opinion organizations and newspapers for more than 20 years. There have also been major gun policies that affected American opinion in the 1990s. Throughout these polling years there are different gun control proposals that show promise for bipartisan action. Over the years listed there have been major tragedies that have affected public opinion. Most of the tragedies are school shootings. There have also been a growth in states around the United States taking more drastic measures on gun control. As of late February and early March 2018, a majority of Americans support stricter gun laws, including wide support for universal background check and mandatory waiting periods for gun purchases and, adding felons and mental illness patients to background check systems, and prohibiting sales of guns to persons under 21 years old.

History

1990s
In the 1990s, public support for gun control led then-president Bill Clinton to sign into law the 1994 Federal Assault Weapons Ban, which remained in force for ten years thereafter before expiring. Another measure by the Clinton Administration was the Brady Bill. This bill was enacted on November 30, 1993, and the main purpose was to create a waiting period for handgun purchases. The bill enacted makes a person subject to a background check when they are trying to purchase a firearm from a federal dealer, manufacturer, and also an importer. Background checks are run through the FBI and go through the National Instant Criminal Background Check System (NICS). Other features of the Brady Bill are also prohibiting transporting firearms if a person falls under certain criteria made under the bill and prohibiting firearm possession if a person has a felonious charge. A 1995 poll found that 58% of Americans were worried the government would not do enough to regulate guns, while only 35% of Americans reported worrying the government would regulate them too much.

2012
A Pew Research Center poll conducted shortly after the 2012 Aurora, Colorado shooting found that 47% of Americans thought controlling gun ownership was more important than protecting the rights of Americans to own guns, while 46% thought the opposite.

Six days after the Sandy Hook elementary school shooting in 2012, another Pew Research Center poll found that 49% of Americans believed that controlling gun ownership was more important than protecting gun rights, while 42% of Americans believed the opposite. This trend of stricter gun control policy could be seen by a Gallup poll that was taken in December 2012. With the question being "In general, do you feel that the laws covering the sale of firearms should be made more strict, less strict or kept as they are now?" there was a result of 58% of respondents believing in stricter laws, 6% supporting less strict laws, and 34% support for keeping laws the same. This marked the first time more Americans supported gun control more than gun rights since President Barack Obama took office in 2009.

2015
A poll conducted by CBS News and New York Times in October 2015 found that 92% of Americans supported universal background checks for all gun sales.

Pew Research Center poll in August 2015 can be looked at as well for asking surveyors based on partisan lines about background checks for gun shows and private sales. Polling from the research center show that Republicans (79%) and Democrats (88%) want background checks for gun show transactions and private sales. This bipartisan view also is expanded upon for barring mentally ill stricken people from obtaining a firearm with Democrats being 81% and Republicans being 79% in favor of this gun control proposal.

While there is a more concise statistical agreement upon background checks for all gun sales there is a growth in people looking at the rights of gun owners. From a Pew Research Center poll that came out in August 2015 there has been a change in opinion on how people view gun rights vs controlling gun ownership. Throughout the various years (2008, 2011) when polling on this topic took place, there was a steady stance on the belief that controlling gun ownership should come before gun rights. In 2008 there was a 49% vs. 45% poll which favored control of gun ownership, as well as in 2011 there was a concurrent agreement of the last poll but with the numbers of 51% to 45%. This would change when the polling topic would be surveyed again in 2014 and published in 2015. The poll found that 52% had the view of protecting gun rights to 46% of people supporting control of gun ownership.

2016
After the Orlando nightclub shooting in June 2016, NBC News and The Wall Street Journal released the results of a poll which found that 50% of Americans were more concerned the government would go too far in regulating guns, while 47% of Americans were more concerned that the government would not do enough to regulate guns. A CBS News poll conducted the same month found that 57% of Americans supported a federal assault weapons ban, 13 percentage points higher than a previous poll they conducted in December 2015 (after the San Bernardino shooting). Also in June 2016, a CNN/Opinion Research Corporation poll found that about 90% of Americans supported universal background checks.

Later in the year polling about gun control measures were politicized through the 2016 presidential elections. A poll came out in August 2016 by the Pew Research Center based on Hillary Clinton and Donald Trump supporters and their stance on gun policy proposals. The research conducted looked at five separate proposals. The five proposals were based on background checks, prevention of ownership of firearms with people with mental illness, barring gun ownership from people on a federal watch, creating a federal database on gun-ownership, banning high-capacity ammunition magazines, and lastly banning assault style weapons. The results that came from the poll show that on the proposal on background checks Trump's supporters are (75%) supportive of this proposal and (90%) supported by Clinton supporters. With the proposal of preventing firearms to people with mental illnesses there is a similar belief by both party supporters in support. Trump supporters are in (82%) and Hilary supporters are (83%) support. The next proposal on barring gun ownership on federal watch and terror lists also show similar support for barring gun ownership for people with mental illness. For Trump supporters they are (72%) support for this proposal while for Clinton supporters it is (80%). After the first three proposals there is a growth in the disparity on how candidate supporters view gun control measures. The federal data base gun control proposal shows a 39-point disparity. While Clinton supporters show an 85% support for a federal database there is only a 46% support in the Trump supporter group. In the next two gun control proposals there is a consistency between Trump supporters with a (34%) favorability. Hilary supporters have a favorability for the last two proposals with a (75%) and then (74%).

2017
A 2018 study looking at a January 2017 survey results find "For 23 of the 24 policies examined, most respondents supported restricting or regulating gun ownership. Only 8 of 24 policies had greater than a 10-point support gap between gun owners and non-gun owners."

On October 11, 2017, ten days after a mass shooting in Las Vegas killed 58 people, a Politico/Morning Consult poll was released. It found that 64% of Americans support stricter gun laws, while 29% opposed them. Support was higher among Democrats (83%) than among independents (58%) and Republicans (49%).

Another topic that came up in the discussion of gun control is the question of should teachers be armed in the classroom for school shooting scenarios. A Pew Research Center poll was conducted in March and April of that year. The results looked a range of adults such as parents and non parents, gun owners and non-gun owners, and lastly on partisan lines. The survey came back to show that more adults (55%) opposed teacher having guns while (45%) favored. In the category of parents and non parents there was more favorably to oppose teachers having guns in the classroom. Parents opposing would represent (53%) and non-parents (56%). The category of gun-owners and non-gun owners show that gun owners would support the measure with the result of (66%) and among non-gun owners they oppose the measure of teachers having guns (64%). The results that stemmed from the basis of partisan lines was that Republicans (69%) supported the measure and between Democrats (71%) opposed having guns with teachers and officials in schools.

2018

On February 21, 2018, eight days after the Stoneman Douglas High School shooting killed 17 people, the surviving students rallied for stricter gun control policies in Tallahassee, Florida, the state's capital and then again asked for the same gun restrictions at a CNN Town Hall later that day. The events led to students across the nation showing their solidarity by walking out of their individual high schools and marching with the survivors. A House Committee vote approved the bill to raise the age from 18 to 21 years old as the minimum age to buy and own a rifle in the state of Florida. As well as, creating a three-day waiting period for all gun purchases. The same bill proposed creating a program which allows teachers who have successfully completed law enforcement training and are deputized by the local county sheriff to carry weapons that are concealed within the classroom, if approved by the school district.

In February 2018, 66% of American voters supported stricter gun laws, in a Quinnipiac University Polling Institute poll with a margin of error of +/- 3.4%, the highest level of support measured since 2008. 70% of American adults supported stricter gun laws, according to a CNN poll with a margin of error of +/- 3.7%. 75% of American adults supported stricter gun laws, according to an NPR/Ipsos poll with a margin of error of +/- 3.5%. 65% of Americans support stricter gun laws, according to a CBS News poll with a margin of error of +/- 4%. In March 2018, 67% of Americans supported stricter regulation of firearms sales, according to a Gallup poll with a margin of sampling error of +/- 4% at the 95% confidence level, the highest in any Gallup survey since 1993.

On March 14, 2018, many schools around the country took part in the Enough! National School Walkout to protest the NRA and current United States gun laws. The nationwide movement started around 10:00 A.M in each time zone and lasted about 17 minutes, each minute representing a victim of the Stoneman Douglas shooting. During the protest, students from different schools took part in many acts of remembrance such as: holding a moment of silence, reading out the names of the victims, or spelling out the rallying cry of the movement—"Enough." However, several schools around the country did not let the activism go unpunished. Students faced anywhere from three-hour detention to five-day suspension for protesting.

Following the 2018 Santa Fe High School shooting, activists in favor of gun control drew parallels between it and the earlier Stoneman Douglas High School shooting. Twitter user Fred Guttenberg, whose daughter Jaime was killed in the Stoneman Douglas shooting, cited this incident as part of a pattern, saying "Now, we have 8 more children dead and our leadership in Washington has done nothing." Reaction among students from Santa Fe has been more mixed, with some students such as Callie Wylie stating that violence is not a "gun problem". A round table hosted by Governor Greg Abbott of Texas, involving students, politicians, and activists, focused less on gun control than on "greater police presence on school campuses and improved strategies to deal with mental health problems".

In greater response to the Stoneman Douglas through an article of CNN that was updated June 13, 2018 there has been a growth in states to respond in how they will control guns in the future. States such as New York, Florida, Nebraska, New Jersey, Washington, Illinois, Vermont, Oregon, Rhode Island, and Connecticut to expand on gun control measures. These measures range from state to state on banning bump stocks, stricter mental health checks, using the legal age to buy a weapon to 21, restricting standard-capacity firearm magazines to 15 or 10 rounds, and even the measure of city ordinances banning assault style weapons. On the federal level even, there was a move by President Donald Trump in March 2018 to prohibit the sale of bump stocks.

Politicians and the public alike have grown increasingly apart in the wake of recent events and tragedies. Many states have started passing legislation to change gun control in America which has led to an increased debate about the topic. Oregon, Washington, Florida, and Rhode Island have all passed legislation that increased gun restrictions in their states in 2018. According to David Owens, these laws all favor ideas presented by Democrats and have been met with backlash from Republicans in the area. On the other side of the coin, two school districts in Connecticut have hired armed guards to be present at the school at all times in order to have an immediate officer on the scene in the event of a shooting. Republicans have supported this idea but Democrats feel that adding more armed people to situations only makes them more dangerous.

2019
In July 2019, the San Diego City Council tentatively approved a new gun safety ordinance that would "require gun owners to store guns in a locked container or disable them with a trigger lock when not in use or being worn on their person". City Attorney Mara Elliott proposed the legislation hoping to reduce the number of accidental shootings, children's access to guns, and suicides. According to her data, "46% of gun owners in the U.S. who have children do not secure their guns and 73% of youngsters aged 9 and under know where their parents keep their guns".

An August 2019 Fox News poll of registered voters found 90% of respondents favored universal background checks, 81% supported taking guns from at-risk individuals, and 67% favored banning assault weapons.

An September 2019 study in Health Affairs concludes "our findings indicate that large majorities of both gun owners and non-gun owners strongly support a range of measures to strengthen US gun laws".

2020 
According to Gallup, in 2020, 32% of U.S. adults say they personally own a gun, while a larger percentage, 44%, report living in a gun household.

2021 
According to a Pew Research Center poll, "roughly half of Americans (53%) favor stricter gun laws, which was a decline since 2019".

2022
A May 2022 Politico/Morning Consult poll found respondents supporting:

 background checks on all gun sales, by a net 80 percentage points;
 creation of a national database with information about each gun sale, by a net 57 points;
 banning of assault-style weapons, by a net 42 points;
 closing the gun show loophole, by a net 70 points;
 requiring gun owners to store their guns in a safe storage unit, by a net 62 points.

Following the racially-motivated Buffalo grocery store shooting that killed ten black people and the Robb Elementary School shooting that killed nineteen students and two teachers in May 2022, Gallup reported in June 2022 that 66% of Americans support stricter gun laws and 55% want Congress to pass new gun laws in addition to enforcing current ones. A June 2022 ABC News/Ipsos poll found that 70% of Americans believed enacting new gun control laws was more important than protecting gun ownership rights. Regarding the impending 2022 midterm elections, Gallup reported that 55% of voters said gun policy is "extremely important", while 8% of voters said that gun control was the country's chief issue.

Predictors
A 2007 study found that an index of individualism and collectivism predicted both gun ownership and attitudes toward gun control in the United States.

See also 

 Mass shootings in the United States
 Gun violence in the United States
 Gun law in the United States
 School shooting

References

Gun politics in the United States
Public opinion in the United States